Eric Grantham (7 September 1913 – 19 July 1989) was a British sports shooter. He competed in the trap event at the 1968 Summer Olympics.

References

1913 births
1989 deaths
British male sport shooters
Olympic shooters of Great Britain
Shooters at the 1968 Summer Olympics
Sportspeople from Yorkshire